Phillip Michael Boyle (born July 21, 1961) is an American politician who served as the Senator for the 4th District of the New York Senate from 2013 to 2022. He is a Republican. The district he served includes the villages of Babylon, Brightwaters, Lindenhurst, Ocean Beach, Saltaire in Suffolk County on Long Island.

Early life and education
Boyle was born in Bay Shore, New York, and grew up in Islip. He attended the State University of New York at Geneseo, and transferred to University of North Carolina at Chapel Hill where he graduated with a Bachelor's Degree in Political Science. He attended Albany Law School where he got his Juris Doctor degree, and also received a Master's in Public Administration from the Rockefeller College of Public Affairs and Policy at the SUNY at Albany. Boyle was a founding partner in the law firm of Steinberg & Boyle, LLP, located in East Islip, New York.

Boyle and his wife, Victoria Ryan, reside in Bay Shore. Boyle is the stepfather to Patrick and Sarah Ryan.

Career
Boyle served several years on Capitol Hill as a senior congressional aide. He was the legislative director to Frank Horton  (R-Rochester) and a campaign manager and chief of staff for Rick Lazio (R-Brightwaters).

In 1994, Boyle was elected to the New York State Assembly as a representative of the 8th Assembly District, which encompassed portions of the Suffolk County towns of Islip and Babylon. He did not seek reelection in 2002 after redistricting divided his district between a strongly Democratic district and a district represented by fellow Republican Thomas F. Barraga.

However, when Barraga ran for the Suffolk County legislature and won, Boyle won a special election to replace him in the Assembly. In 2012, Boyle decided to run for election to the New York Senate, winning a tough race against County Legislator Ricardo Montano 52% to 48%.

In 2017, Boyle ran for Suffolk County Sheriff, but lost the Republican primary to Lawrence M. Zacarese. He then ran for the New York State Supreme Court, and lost.

Senate 
In 2013, Boyle voted in favor of the SAFE Act, to enact an assault weapons ban, to limit the number of rounds allowed in a magazine to seven, and to raise the legal age to own a rifle or shotgun. In 2020, the National Rifle Association gave Boyle a 42 percent rating.

In 2017, Boyle introduced legislation to ban minors from purchasing machetes. The bill passed the Senate, but was not voted on in the Assembly. This followed several machete attacks associated with the gang MS-13 in Suffolk County.

References

External links
 
Sponsored Legislation
Sponsored Resolutions
 Profile at Egan & Golden

1961 births
Living people
Politicians from Suffolk County, New York
Republican Party members of the New York State Assembly
Republican Party New York (state) state senators
University of North Carolina at Chapel Hill alumni
University at Albany, SUNY alumni
Albany Law School alumni
People from Bay Shore, New York
People from East Islip, New York
21st-century American politicians